Although Austria is a landlocked country with a distinguished hilly topography, meteorological preconditions permit the utilization of wind power. First calculations on the basis of wind measuring data assessed at the meteorological stations in the early 1980s rendered the surprising result of annually approx. 6,600 to 10,000 gigawatt-hour (GWh) of technically exploitable wind energy potential in Austria.
 
Austria ranked as the world's seventeenth largest producer of wind power with an installed nameplate capacity of 995 megawatt (MW) in 2008, behind Ireland and ahead of Greece.

History
Back in the 1980s, there were huge private wind measurements and experiments with smaller plants.  In 1994, initiated by Councilor Waltner, 110 kilowatt (kW) wind turbine was set up in St. Pölten. Another wind turbine was put into operation six months later in Zistersdorf. In 1995, the first wind turbine was built with civic participation in Michelbach.

In January 1996, the first turbine of the type E-40 with 500 kW was placed in Eberschwang. Not only the absolute largest wind turbines were placed there, but with two plants the first „wind farm“ was established. In the course of 1996, no signs of new funding arrangements had emerged. It led by the end of the year in a panic reaction from the first „boom“ for wind power.

36 wind turbines with 12 MW and an annual total of 18 million kW of work hours had been set up between New Year's Day and New Year's Eve. After 1996, there were, only in exceptional cases, economic conditions for individual projects, including the wind park in Zurndorf with six plants.

The pressure of individual countries and the idea that desired objectives could be reached nationwide cheaper than by any nation-state alone resulted into negotiations between federal and state governments to a new nationwide Green Electricity Act 2002 (Ökostromgesetz 2002) in spring 2002.

Wind turbines with a capacity of a total of 276 MW were built in 2003. The plant output tripled from 139 MW (end 2002) to 415 MW (end 2003) within a year.

Economics

Life span of wind turbines

According to manufacturers, the life span of wind turbines amounts to 25 years. Important influences on the life span are site specific (wind speed, storms, icing conditions) and the quality of the maintenance of the turbines.

External costs

External costs are not a part of the investment and operation costs, and are paid by the tax payer and therefore by the public. Examples of external costs for fossil fuel and nuclear electricity production are political and military securing of the access to these energy sources, costs of green house gas emissions, cleaning up of spilled oil, police operations during the transporting of nuclear wastes and other similar activities. Negative external costs arise from wind turbines' impact on landscape aesthetics, animal habitats, increased mortality of bats and birds, noise, and flickering. However, wind power also has positive external effects on power system operation and through the mitigation of air pollution. The hidden costs of wind power in Austria are currently not quantified.

Property for wind turbines

Most of the property owners are farmers. They have an additional source of income by leasing their land to the wind park operator. The prices paid for property leases for wind turbines are many times more than would normally be earned by farming the property.

A wind turbine needs an area of up to 500 square metres (5,382 square feet) and the rest of the property can still be farmed without any problem. A wind turbine can also be easily and quickly dismantled.

Costs of electricity production

According to the costs for infrastructure, a kW of installed capacity costs between €880  and €1,487  (Windpark Handalm). (At the Tauernwindpark a kW costs €1,240 ).

Installed capacity growth
The table shows an annual increase in installed wind power capacity.

Advantages
Production of wind power does not release any pollutants. A wind park with 6 MW installed capacity will reduce approximately the following emissions yearly:

Gallery

See also

Energy in Austria
European Wind Energy Association
Global Wind Energy Council
Wind power in the European Union
Solar power in Austria
Renewable energy by country

Notes

References
English
Analyzing the Wind Power Industry in Austria
Tauernwind
Wind turbines and windfamrs database
Advantages and Disadvantages of Wind Energy

German
Geschichte der Windkraft in Österreich

External links

Interessengemeinschaft Windkraft – Austrian Wind Energy Association